Between November 2022 and January 2023, approximately 25 to 30 classified government documents were discovered by President Joe Biden's attorneys in his former office at the Penn Biden Center in Washington, D.C., and in his personal residence in Wilmington, Delaware, dating to his time in the Senate and his vice presidency in the Obama administration. 

On November 2, 2022, Biden's attorneys discovered the first set of classified documents in a locked closet at the Penn Biden Center; they reported them that day to the National Archives and Records Administration (NARA), which retrieved them the next day. The classified documents included intelligence material and briefing memos on Ukraine, Iran and the United Kingdom. In coordination with the Justice Department (DOJ), Biden's attorneys discovered a second set of documents at Biden's home on December 20, followed by several more on January 9 and January 12, 2023. Biden's personal attorney said on January 21 that the Justice Department discovered six items  containing classification markings during a consensual search of his home the previous day, some of which dated to his tenure in the Senate; investigators also seized some of Biden's handwritten notes from his vice presidency.

On November 14, 2022, Attorney General Merrick Garland assigned U.S. Attorney John R. Lausch Jr. to conduct an initial investigation. On January 12, Attorney General Merrick Garland appointed Robert K. Hur as special counsel to investigate "possible unauthorized removal and retention of classified documents or other records". The next day, the House Judiciary Committee opened a separate investigation into the documents.

Background 
CNN reported that the process to return Biden's documents to NARA began many weeks before his Vice Presidency ended, but was made more difficult by the fact that Biden continued to use his vice presidential offices and continued to receive more classified documents. CNN, quoting "former aides and others with direct knowledge of the process", reported that most of the actual packing of Biden's belongings and documents was done by lower-level staffers, though the staff had "clear Presidential Records Act guidelines" and took those guidelines seriously. One of the staffers who carried out the packing was Biden's then-executive assistant Kathy Chung. According to a defense official, she was interviewed in the probe of classified documents found in Biden’s personal offices. The documents "not deemed covered by the records requirements to submit to the National Archives" were stored at a temporary facility run by the General Services Administration near the White House before eventually being moved to the Penn Biden Center.

Discoveries and other developments

First batch of documents 
On November 2, 2022, Joe Biden's personal attorneys found classified documents dating to his vice presidency, some of which were top secret sensitive compartmented information, in a locked closet while packing files at the Penn Biden Center for Diplomacy and Global Engagement, a think tank where Biden worked after leaving the government in 2017. The White House notified NARA on the same day of the discovery; NARA retrieved the documents the next day and notified its inspector general, who referred the matter to the DOJ on November 4. The FBI and DOJ initiated an assessment of whether classified materials had been mishandled on November 9, notifying Biden's personal attorneys the next day.

DOJ letter to Bob Bauer 
The Washington Post reported in January 2023 that a senior DOJ national security division official wrote to Biden's personal attorney Bob Bauer in mid-November, asking the Biden legal team to secure the documents found at Penn Biden Center and refrain from further reviewing them, or other documents that might be in other locations. The letter also requested formal permission to examine the Penn Biden materials, and asked for a list of other locations where documents might be stored. The letter implied that the DOJ would take the lead in the inquiry; this allowed Biden's team to approach the situation with caution and deference to the DOJ, only acting in coordination with federal investigators in the hope that the matter would be quickly resolved. The resulting lack of transparency in public communications led to perceptions by some in the media that the Biden team was obfuscating details.

Second batch of documents 
On December 20, a second batch of classified documents was discovered by Biden's attorneys in the garage of his home in Wilmington, Delaware. On January 11, 2023, a one-page classified document was also found in a room adjacent to the garage, described as Biden's private library. This discovery was made and reported by Biden's personal attorneys, who immediately stopped searching that room because they did not have security clearances. On January 12, five more one-page classified documents were recovered from the library by the White House attorney and DOJ representatives who had gone there to collect them. None of these documents were classified as top secret. CBS News reported on January 13 that a total of about 20 documents were found at the Penn Biden Center and Biden's home in Wilmington.

The finding of the second batch of classified documents at Biden's residence was not initially disclosed to the public when the White House made its initial disclosure on January 9. White House Press Secretary Karine Jean-Pierre defended the communication, saying the search of the second batch "was still ongoing" at that time of the initial statements and "after the search concluded ... we released a statement disclosing the facts from that search". She later stated that the DOJ inquiry prevented the administration from disclosing the matter to the public.

FBI search of Biden's Wilmington home 
On January 20 the FBI conducted a 13-hour search of the entire premises of Biden's Wilmington home. The next day his personal attorney Bob Bauer revealed the search, saying that the agents had examined "personally handwritten notes, files, papers, binders, memorabilia, to-do lists, schedules, and reminders going back decades". They identified and removed six documents containing classified markings from Biden's home office, some from his time in the Senate and some from his vice presidency.  They also took possession of some of his notes. Biden and his wife were at their Rehoboth Beach, Delaware home at the time. CNN reported the search was conducted with the consent of Biden's attorneys, so a subpoena or search warrant was not required.

Other searches

On February 1 the FBI searched Biden's home in Rehoboth Beach. According to Biden's attorney, the FBI found no classified documents, but took papers and notes from his time as vice president. On February 16 it was reported that the FBI had carried out a search at the University of Delaware, where most of Biden's papers and documents are housed. The search did not initially turn up any classified information, but the material is still being reviewed, according to someone familiar with the matter.

Investigations 

After the discovery of the first batch of documents, on November 14, 2022, Attorney General Merrick Garland assigned U.S. Attorney John R. Lausch Jr. to conduct an initial investigation.

Special counsel 
On January 5, 2023, Lausch advised Garland that a special counsel was warranted. On January 12, Garland announced that he was appointing a special counsel to investigate "possible unauthorized removal and retention of classified documents or other records". He named  Robert K. Hur to oversee the investigation. His investigation will examine “the possible unauthorized removal and retention of classified documents or other records discovered” at Biden's think tank in Washington and at his home. According to NBC News, multiple Biden aides have already been interviewed by federal law enforcement.

The Wall Street Journal reported the DOJ and Biden's attorneys agreed the FBI would not be present as the attorneys inspected the president's properties for documents. The Journal said the DOJ found the Biden team was cooperating and was anticipating an investigation that might extend well into 2024.

Congressional 
House Oversight Committee chairman James Comer (R-KY) wrote to NARA and the White House counsel on January 10, requesting documents and communications between them and the Justice Department. He wrote he was investigating possible political bias by NARA by contrasting how the Biden and Trump documents matters were handled. Comer stated that his committee planned to investigate who had access to Penn Biden Center.

The House Judiciary Committee opened an investigation on January 13. Committee chairman Jim Jordan wrote to Garland demanding all documents and communications between the FBI, Justice Department and White House about the matter, as well as information about Hur's appointment as special counsel.

Responses

Joe Biden and his legal team 
Biden stated that he was "surprised" when he learned of the documents found at Penn Biden Center. The White House also stated that Biden does not know what is in the documents. He added that he would cooperate fully with the investigation. Biden's legal team has denied any wrongdoing, stating that the documents were "inadvertently misplaced".

In response to the discovery of a second set of classified documents at Biden's Wilmington home, Biden acknowledged his possession of the documents, stating "I'm going to get the chance to speak on all of this, God willing it'll be soon, but I said earlier this week — and by the way my Corvette is in a locked garage. It's not like it's sitting out in the street."

Biden and his advisors did not disclose the discovery of the documents to the public for 68 days. According to The New York Times, Biden's team hoped that they could convince the Justice Department it was a good-faith mistake and resolve the matter before it could impact the image of Biden or his presidency. According to The Times, this strategy has appeared to have "backfired" and left Biden open to criticism.

Elected officials

Republican elected officials 
House Republicans compared the incident to former president Donald Trump's retention of documents. House Speaker Kevin McCarthy (R-CA) stated that Congress should investigate the Biden matter and launch its own probe. 

Mike Turner (R-OH), incoming chair of the House Intelligence Committee, asked for a national security damage assessment regarding the Biden documents. Jim Jordan (R-OH), incoming chair of the House Judiciary Committee, launched an investigation and wrote to Garland requesting information and documents. Representatives James Comer (R-KY), Ken Buck (R-CO), and Elise Stefanik (R-NY and chair of the House Republican Conference) demanded that Biden release a visitor log of his home, though such logs are not kept for presidents' personal homes.

Democratic elected officials 
Democratic officials possessed a mixed response to the incident, with some accusing the Republicans of hypocrisy, others suggested a congressional review of the materials, due to national security concerns, while a small minority, such as U.S. Representative Hank Johnson, baselessly suggested the classified documents were planted to embarrass Biden. Democrats in the former group argued that the same Republican officials had defended Trump's possession and retention of many more documents over a period of years, while Biden's team had immediately notified NARA of the discovery and turned over the documents.

Senator Ben Cardin (D-MD) said the Republicans are creating a "false equivalency" because "one person (Biden) handled it right, the other person (Trump) handled it wrong." Representative Adam Schiff (D-CA) stated that the situation with Biden is different from the situation with Trump. Schiff also said the handling of the documents may have compromised national security. Senator Debbie Stabenow (D-MI) called Biden's previous comments in 2022 on Trump's document possession "embarrassing", given the current incident.

Media analysis 
Multiple media outlets such as BBC News, CNN, and The New York Times reported significant differences between the Biden incident and the ongoing FBI investigation into Donald Trump's handling of government documents. In Biden's case, the documents were not the subject of a request or inquiry by NARA; Biden notified NARA upon discovery, and Biden returned the documents the next day. In Trump's case, NARA realized notable documents from his administration were missing; they requested the documents from Trump, but Trump did not return all the documents, even following a subpoena and ultimately the FBI search of Mar-a-Lago. The New York Times also noted that Trump mishandled hundreds of documents, while Biden only mishandled a comparatively small number of them. The Washington Post said the incident "is likely to rob him of the unvarnished ability" to criticize Trump for his document scandal.

Misinformation 
On January 12, 2023, an anonymous Twitter account posted a rental application found on Hunter Biden's laptop, falsely claiming that in 2018, Biden had paid $49,910 in monthly rent for his father's Delaware residence where the documents were found. On January 14, Miranda Devine of the New York Post tweeted the same application. A day later, a Breitbart reporter falsely claimed that Hunter had been living at the residence in 2018 and may have had access to classified documents. His post was retweeted by House Republican Conference chair Elise Stefanik who added that "Joe Biden and the Biden Crime Family are corrupt and significant threats to national security. Our Republican House Majority will hold them accountable."

James Comer, chair of the House Oversight Committee that is investigating the Biden family, suggested it was evidence that Hunter Biden may have been funneling foreign money to his father. In the following days, the allegations were promoted by the Daily Caller and by Tucker Carlson, Sean Hannity, and other Fox News personalities. The document actually showed quarterly rental payments for office space at the House of Sweden in Washington, D.C.

Discovery of classified documents at Mike Pence's residence

On January 24, 2023, it was reported that former vice president Mike Pence's attorney had notified the Department of Justice that documents marked classified had been found at Pence's Indiana residence. Pence's attorney's letter said he had hired "outside counsel with experience in handling classified documents" to review records kept at his residence, following the revelations regarding classified documents being found at Biden's residence. The letter said that these documents appeared to have been "inadvertently boxed and transported to the personal home of the former vice president at the end of the last administration".

References

2023 controversies in the United States
2023 in American politics
2023 in Delaware
2023 in Washington, D.C.
January 2023 events in the United States
Political controversies in the United States
Classified information in the United States
Classified documents incident
Classified documents incident